Weed: The User's Guide: A 21st Century Handbook for Enjoying Marijuana is a 2016 book about cannabis by Seattle writer David Schmader. Schmader is also a writer for The Stranger, a Seattle alt weekly newspaper, where he writes a cannabis column . The book is in part a cannabis cookbook, containing an edibles recipe section.

Critical reception
Critics of the book said it is "beautifully designed" and a "smartly written pot primer", but misses some information like quick decarboxylation of cannabis in a home oven. One critic said the book was "testament to the progress, triumph and privilege of legalized recreational marijuana in the author's state" of Washington.

See also
 List of books about cannabis

References

Further reading

External links

Pathways radio podcast May 1, 2016 Paul O'Brien host

2016 non-fiction books
American books about cannabis
Cannabis cookbooks
Non-fiction books about cannabis
Sasquatch Books books